Sardar Arif Shahid was a Kashmiri nationalist leader who advocated independence of Kashmir from both India and Pakistan's rule. He was killed on 14 May 2013 outside his house in Rawalpindi. His supporters allege that he was killed by Pakistan security forces.

Arif Shahid was also the first pro-independence Kashmiri leader who was killed in Pakistan.

References

2013 deaths
Year of birth missing
Politicians from Azad Kashmir